The 51st World Rowing Junior Championships were held from 2 to 6 August 2017 at the Trakai Rowing Centre in Trakai, Lithuania.

Medal summary

Men's events

Women's events

Medal table

See also
 2017 World Rowing Championships
 2017 World Rowing U23 Championships

References

External links
Official website 
WorldRowing website

2017
2017 in Lithuanian sport
International sports competitions hosted by Lithuania
Sports competitions in Trakai
2017 in rowing
August 2017 sports events in Europe
Rowing competitions in Lithuania